The 1889 South Dakota gubernatorial election was held on October 1, 1889, to elect the first Governor of South Dakota. Territorial Governor Arthur C. Mellette received the Republican nomination and faced former Territorial Commissioner of Immigration P. F. McClure, the Democratic nominee, in the general election. Mellette defeated McClure in a landslide.

Party conventions
At the Republican convention in August 1889, Territorial Governor Arthur C. Mellette faced no opponents in the gubernatorial race and was nominated by acclamation. The next week, at the Democratic convention, Adjutant General James W. Harden was nominated for governor, but upon the nomination of Territorial Commissioner of Immigration P. F. McClure, Harden's name was withdrawn and McClure was nominated by acclamation.

References

1889
Gubernatorial
South Dakota
October 1889 events